Ifield Community College (ICC) is a maintained comprehensive secondary school for pupils aged 11 to 18.

Admissions
It caters for around 1000 pupils in years 7 to 13, including over 100 in its sixth form. It is situated in the west of Crawley, next to the A23. Ifield railway station is nearby to the south.

The school is entirely comprehensive, providing education for around 1000 pupils aged between 11 and 18 of all abilities.

Most pupils attending the school live within the catchment area, and transfer from one of the local primary schools:
 The Mill Academy School
 Waterfield Primary School
 West Green Primary School
 The Bewbush Academy
 Gossops Green Primary School
 Langley Green Primary School
 St.Margarets Primary School

History
The school has history dating back to 1852 – nearly 100 years before the coming of the new town. It began life as a free school opened by Mrs Sarah Robinson in the village of Crawley. A new building was opened in 1854 in what was later to become known as Robinson Road in honour of the teacher. In 1953, the school lost its primary-aged pupils with the opening of the new West Green county junior and infants' school. Many older pupils were moved to the newly opened Hazelwick School with the remainder transferring to the new Sarah Robinson secondary modern School buildings opened on the Ifield campus in 1956.

Comprehensive
At this time, the secondary modern school shared a campus with the newly opened Ifield County Grammar School, built in 1955. The schools worked closely together, eventually merging in 1966 to become Ifield comprehensive school following retirement of F.W. Wilmott, the Headmaster at the Sarah Robinson school. A distinguished headmaster, Mr Bomford, was brought in to oversee the transition and he introduced a new formality, with senior teachers wearing gowns in assemblies for the first time. Ifield had a considerable reputation for sport, particularly soccer and athletics. The pupils at this time included Jeff Bryant, who went on to be a professional footballer with Wimbledon and Alan Minter, a future World Boxing Champion.

By 1984 there were some 1600 pupils on roll - including Keith Newell who went on to play cricket for Sussex County Cricket Club.

Developments in the early 1980s saw the two separate buildings co-locating, with former buildings becoming the home of Ifield Middle School in 1985. In 2005, a new school building opened in the centre of the campus, with the old buildings being demolished.

Campus
The campus for the school was set aside in the masterplan for Crawley New Town along the eastern edge of the neighbourhood of Ifield alongside the A23. It was shared with St Margaret's Church of England primary school, and later the Holy Cross Intermediate School.

In 2005, a new building for the school was opened in the southeasternmost corner of the large campus, maintaining the existing tree-lined boundaries. The campus is still shared with St Margaret's School, and now The Mill Primary School and the Manor Green special schools.

Choir
Ifield Community College had a very successful and accomplished choir made up of students from all age groups in the school. In 1996 it was the subject of a film by SVC television, directed by Andrew Vere.
The choir, led by Patrick Allen (music educator), has performed at some of Europe's major venues, including St Mark's Basilica in Venice (2008),the Royal Festival Hall, London, Barcelona Cathedral, the Auditorium Stravinski in Montreux and a recent (June 2011) collaboration with the BBC Singers saw them performing and recording at Maida Vale Studios. They have been six times finalists at the National Festival of Music for Youth, most recently in 2009, 2010 and 2014. The choir was the subject of a feature on BBC Radio 3's Music Matters in May 2011, focusing on the integration of the choir's Chagossian Drummers. The choir also represented the UK in The Let The People's Sing Gala Concert, broadcast on BBC Radio 3 in October 2011. The choir broadcast live on BBC Radio 3 in March 2012 as part of the Voice's Now festival from The Roundhouse, London.

References

External links
 Official School website
 Ifield Community College information on West Sussex Grid for Learning
 Ofsted Information on the school
 EduBase
 Ifield Community College Choir website

Buildings and structures in Crawley
Secondary Schools in Crawley
Secondary schools in West Sussex
Educational institutions established in 1966
1966 establishments in England
Community schools in West Sussex